Abbas el Hocine Bencheikh called Sheikh Abbas (1912, in Mila Algeria – 3 May 1989, in Paris), was an Algerian diplomat, cleric, writer, and rector of the Muslim Institute and the Great Mosque of Paris.

After theological studies in family brotherhood and once aged 21, Sheikh Abbas studied at the Islamic University of Zaytuna in Tunis and that of al-Qarawiyyin in Fez. After ten years, he returned to Algeria and became the disciple of the reformer Abdelhamid Ben Badis. He campaigned with him for religious and political reform (commonly known as "al-iṣlāḥ" by Muslim reformists). At independence of Algeria, he was appointed ambassador to Saudi Arabia, following his resignation from the post he has held the office of President of the Supreme Islamic Council of Algeria, a seat he left to pursue weekly preaching in the Djamaa el Kebir mosque. In 1982, Sheikh Abbas took charge of the Great Mosque of Paris, succeeding Sheikh Hamza Boubakeur. He restructured the mosque by creating a second prayer room and putting in place additional social services.

He allowed the mosque to receive a share of a specific budget from the Department of Endowments of Algeria and secondly to develop a body of 80 imams.

He intervened to resolve the painful issue of divorce between binational families, especially in defending the rights of French mothers whose children had been brought in Algeria after the divorce. He also interjected to facilitate the return of many French-Muslims (Harkis) who had left the Algeria since independence in 1962 and stay there instead.

References

See also 
Soheib Bencheikh
Hamza Boubakeur
The Great Mosque of Paris
Abdelhamid Ben Badis
Islam in France

1912 births
1989 deaths
20th-century imams
Muslim reformers
Algerian imams
Algerian diplomats
20th-century diplomats
Ambassadors of Algeria to Saudi Arabia
People from Mila